Pail Shop Corners is a hamlet located at the corner of Hoke Road, Goose Street, and CR-26 north of Fly Creek in the Town of Otsego, in Otsego County, New York, United States. The Fly Creek Cider Mill and Orchard is located by Pail Shop Corners.

References

Hamlets in Otsego County, New York